Oleksandr Vladylenovych Yaroslavskyi (born 5 December 1959, Zhdanov) is a Ukrainian businessman. He was formerly co-owner of UkrSibbank and president of FC Metalist Kharkiv (2005-2012). Yaroslavskyi is the president of DCH (Development Construction Holding) and one of the most influential people in Ukraine according to Ukrainian and Eastern European media. In 2016, Forbes ranked him among the top ten richest people in Ukraine. In November 2018, Russia imposed sanctions against 322 citizens of Ukraine, including Yaroslavskyi.

Achievements 
In 2018 and 2019, Oleksandr Yaroslavskyi received the title of Doctor Honoris Causa of O. M. Beketov National University of Urban Economy and V. N. Karazin Kharkiv National University, the best Ukrainian university according to World University Rankings 2018, for the personal weighty contribution to the development of Kharkiv and many years of support for the city's leading universities included in the world rankings.

He regularly meets with students to talk about business and life. In 2019, Jack Ma, the founder of Alibaba and one of the richest people in the world, had a conversation with students in Kharkiv at Oleksandr Yaroslavskyi's invitation.

For many years, Oleksandr Yaroslavskyi has been systematically giving support to universities in Kharkiv and helping to improve the quality of education: DCH and Kharkiv Tractor Plant (KhTP) have signed a strategic partnership memorandum with V. N. Karazin Kharkiv National University (KhNU) and National Technical University "Kharkiv Polytechnic Institute". With the comprehensive organizational and financial support from Oleksandr Yaroslavskyi, students and faculty members created the Megapolis Technology Transfer Center at O. M. Beketov National University of Urban Economy. This center helps to create a business space to develop technological and social innovative ideas that can be integrated into day-to-day business activities of enterprises and organizations.

Thanks to Oleksandr Yaroslavskyi, students, graduate students and professors of KhNU can now use the electronic publication database of the world's most famous university press—Oxford University Press. Oleksandr Yaroslavskyi paid for a subscription worth about UAH 1 million for his hometown university that can now access the English-language academic papers written by the world's most talented scientists of Oxford University in the fields of natural sciences, medicine, mathematics, humanities and social sciences, economics and finance, and jurisprudence.

Oleksandr Yaroslavsky provided financial support to erect monuments to outstanding historical figures associated with KhNU within its territory: Nobel Prize winners Ilya Mechnikov, Lev Landau and Simon Kuznets, as well as the classic of Ukrainian literature Petro Hulak-Artemovskyi. A monument to the famous architect Oleksii Beketov (the university bears his name) was erected on the territory of O. M. Beketov National University of Urban Economy.

Early life 
Oleksandr Yaroslavskyi was born in Zhdanov (now Mariupol) in the south of the Ukrainian SSR. Both of his parents were doctors. A few years later, his parents moved to Kharkiv. The future businessman graduated as a technologist from the Kharkiv Academy of Public Nutrition and then spent 3 years doing military service in the Soviet Army in Hungary. Upon being demobilized, he took jurisprudence courses provided by the Ministry of Internal Affairs and spent a year working as an inspector in the Kharkiv Department Against Misappropriation of Socialist Property (so called OBKhSS). In 1989, he graduated from the Odesa Institute of Technology as a Candidate of Technical Sciences and worked at the Kharkiv Institute of Food Technology. The collapse of the Soviet Union became a new reference point in his career.

Business 
Oleksandr Yaroslavskyi was the Vice President of Geya JSC until 1996 and then became the Vice President of the Ukrainian representative office of Triverton International (until 1997). Since 1998, he was the President and principal shareholder of JSCIB UKRSIB Group. In 2006, he ceded control of UkrSibbank to BNP Paribas and focused on consolidating his assets within a single legal entity—DCH Group—solely owned by him. In 2010, UkrSibbank was completely controlled by BNP Paribas that worked closely with DCH on workout issues. Today, DCH is one of the most powerful business groups in Ukraine, including financial institutions, industrial facilities, in particular, mining enterprises (e.g. Ukrainian Mining Company), development companies, luxury real estate (in particular, Vozdvizhenka, the elite residential complex in Kyiv). Oleksandr Yaroslavskyi's key interests include protecting the investments of his foreign partners (BNP Paribas, Citigroup and Apollo). Both of these companies, along with DCH, have their own shares in the network of Karavan shopping centers.

DCH renovated the Kharkiv International Airport. The state financed the renovation of the airfield, and Oleksandr Yaroslavskyi constructed a new terminal, which is currently the only private terminal in Ukraine, and renovated old airport buildings. Over the past 25 years, this has been the first project of its kind in Ukraine. The new terminal of the Kharkiv International Airport was inaugurated on 28 August 2010.

On 25 February 2011 DCH closed the sale of Merefa Glass Company Ltd. to the Turkish company Sisecam in a deal amounting to EUR 32 million.

In early March 2011, DCH sold OJSC Azot to Dmytro Firtash. The deal value was not disclosed, but Oleksandr Yaroslavskyi said that he was satisfied. According to experts, it was about USD 800 million.

Oleksandr Yaroslavskyi also invested in the construction of the first luxury hotel in Kharkiv. Kharkiv Palace 5* opened on 5 December 2011. During Euro 2012, it was the HQ for UEFA.

Oleksandr Yaroslavskyi regularly attends the World Economic Forum in Davos. Together with Victor Pinchuk, he co-hosted the Ukrainian Lunch in 2011. With the Ukrainian delegation, he participated in the Yalta European Strategy (YES) in 2011 and 2013.

In 2016, he bought back a controlling stake in Kharkiv Tractor Plant (KhTP), which he sold in 2007.

In 2017–2018, he bought Dniprovsky Metallurgical Plant and Sukha Balka Mine.

In 2020, DCH will begin to construct the industrial technology park Ecopolis KhTP within the territory of KhTP, which will include an industrial park, a technology park, a distribution center for online trading, a logistics center, a shopping cluster, research, educational and medical centers.

In 2020, DCH will construct the airport terminal at the Dnipro Airport.

In 2020, DCH plans to enter the road construction and repair market in Ukraine.

In 2022, DCH groupe announce the complete destruction of four of their five facilities in the Kharkiv

Construction Projects in Dnipro 
In the spring of 2020, DCH group starts a project to build a modern terminal at the Dnipro International Airport in the format of public-private partnership, as was done with the modernization of the Kharkiv International Airport: the state finances the modernization of runways and take-off and landing service systems, and the private investor creates airport infrastructure at his own expense. After the renovation and construction of a new 3,200 m runway, the airport in the Dnipro International Airport will be able to accommodate modern air liners of all types, including Boeing 777. The new international terminal and VIP terminal will have a high airport capacity—up to 3–4 million travelers a year.

Ecopolis KhTP
Ecopolis KhTP is one of the DCH's most ambitious projects that involves redeveloping the territory of the Kharkiv Tractor Plant (KhTP) into a multi-functional business ecosystem.

The investments in this project amount to USD 1 billion until 2033.

The total area of Ecopolist KhTP will exceed 150 hectares within Kharkiv; the area of buildings and facilities will be more than 550 thousand square meters.

The existing KhTP will become one of the anchor residents of Ecopolis. The technology park will be the residence of the Kharkiv IT industry: it will house a business incubator, a startup accelerator and a distribution center for online trading.

The research center will include an agriculture hub, and the educational cluster will include higher education institutions and a business school, including the Kharkiv Institute of Physics and Technology, the Karazin Business School, the Confucius Institute, etc.

FC Metalist 
Oleksandr Yaroslavskyi became the owner of FC Metalist in 2006. Under his leadership, the club set a national record by winning the bronze medal of the national championship for six consecutive years. During this period, Metalist also qualified for the semi-finals of the Ukrainian Football Cup twice and consistently participated in the UEFA Cup, reaching the quarter-final stage in 2012.

Kharkiv was one of the four Ukrainian cities that hosted Euro 2012 (three matches of the European tournament). In addition, Oleksandr Yaroslavskyi initiated a modernization program for city's sports infrastructure, including the reconstruction of the Metalist Stadium. In total, Oleksandr Yaroslavskyi invested USD 300 million in the preparation of Kharkiv for Euro 2012. Implemented projects: 1. Reconstruction of the Metalist Stadium in the public-private partnership (with Oleksandr Yaroslavskyi contributing 30%). The stadium opened on 5 December 2009. 2. Construction of a modern training center for FC Metalist—100% financed by Oleksandr Yaroslavskyi (this was a training camp during Euro 2012). 3. Construction of a children's football academy—100% financed by Oleksandr Yaroslavskyi. During the preparation and hosting of Euro 2012, this was used as the UEFA volunteer center.

In December 2012, Oleksandr Yaroslavskyi sold FC Metalist to Sergey Kurchenko.

EURO 2012 Museum
On his 60th birthday (5 December 2019) Oleksandr Yaroslavskyi, the main investor who contributed to the preparation of Kharkiv infrastructure to host guests and matches during Euro 2012, held a grand opening ceremony at the first stage of construction of Euro 2012 Museum.

On this day, the renovated Metalist Stadium, the home arena of FC Metalist that was owned by Oleksandr Yaroslavskyi, marked the 10th anniversary since its inauguration. This event of 2009 marked the start of an ambitious project: Kharkiv, which was only a reserve city and had powerful competitors, and Oleksandr Yaroslavskyi joined the fray to host Euro 2012 matches.

The businessman plans to invest up to USD 1.5 million in the museum and its collection that is replenished with championship artifacts. It will feature documentary photo and video materials, memorabilia related to the hosting of Euro 2012, European football stars and UEFA regional headquarters.

Political activity 
In 2002–2006, Oleksandr Yaroslavskyi was a People's Deputy in the Verkhovna Rada of Ukraine of IV convocation as a member of the Party of Greens of Ukraine.

From 2012 to 2020, he was in conflict with Hennadiy Kernes, the mayor of Kharkiv.

Charity 
In October 2010, Oleksandr Yaroslavskyi and Dmytro Firtash (owner of DF Group) bought the painting "In Love" by the scandalous British artist Damien Hirst for EUR 1,750,000 euros, which was a record for the Ukrainian auction business, at a charity dinner hosted by the Elena Pinchuk ANTIAIDS Foundation. The proceeds went towards expanding the joint project between the ANTIAIDS Foundation and the Clinton Foundation. Together with John Elkann, a representative of the Agnelli dynasty, Oleksandr Yaroslavskyi participates in projects that aim to develop youth football. He also supports other charitable projects (e.g. the Rіdny DIM Foundation).

Personal life

Family 
Oleksandr Yaroslavskyi is married and has five children. In 2015, Maryna Sventytska, the wife of Oleksandr Yaroslavskyi, won the competition of the most beautiful wives of Ukrainian millionaires.

Hobby 
He practices yoga, plays tennis and is keen on scuba diving and skiing. Oleksandr Yaroslavskyi, a huge fan of rugby, sponsors the Olympus Rugby Club (Kharkiv). Olympus is one of the leading rugby clubs of Ukraine and a talent factory for the national rugby team. This club is a fifteen-time rugby union champion of Ukraine, ten-time rugby sevens champion of Ukraine, nine-time winner of rugby union cup of Ukraine and seven-time winner of rugby sevens cup of Ukraine.

Partners
The businessman has smooth or friendly relations with representatives of the Ukrainian business elite.

For example, Pavlo Fuks and Ihor Kolomoyskyi played table football at a grandiose party on the occasion of his 60th birthday. Victor Pinchuk and Hennadiy Boholiubov, Ihor Kolomoyskyi's business partner, visited the party too.

In addition, Oleksandr Yaroslavskyi put an end to the protracted conflict with Hennadiy Kernes, the mayor of Kharkiv. At the birthday party of the founder of DCH, Pavlo Fuks gave a toast and conveyed greetings and congratulations to the hero of the occasion from the mayor of Kharkiv who wished him every success. Pavlo Fuks also said that Hennadiy Kernes would like to award the title of Honorary Freedom of the City of Kharkiv to Oleksandr Yaroslavskyi on the city day (23 August). Oleksandr Yaroslavskyi thanked and wished Kernes good health.

Subsequently, the mayor of Kharkiv celebrated the 2020 New Year with Oleksandr Yaroslavskyi at his New Year's party held at his five-star luxury hotel Kharkiv Palace.

Awards

Oleksandr Yaroslavskyi has a number of state awards and awards from the Orthodox Church of Ukraine.

 Badge of Honor     "Slobozhanska Slava" (2009) Currently, Oleksandr Yaroslavskyi is the President of DCH (Development Construction Holding) and one of the most influential persons in Ukraine according to Ukrainian and Eastern European media. 
 In 2016, Forbes ranked him among the top ten richest people in Ukraine. 
 On November 1, 2018, Russia imposed sanctions against 322 citizens of Ukraine, including Oleksandr Yaroslavskyi

References

External links 
 DCH Website 
 Oleksandr Yaroslavskyi's profile on Korrespondent.net 
 Oleksandr Yaroslavskyi's profile on file.liga.net 

Ukrainian oligarchs
Fourth convocation members of the Verkhovna Rada
Living people
1959 births
People from Mariupol
Party of Greens of Ukraine politicians
Ukrainian football chairmen and investors
FC Metalist Kharkiv
Ukrainian billionaires
20th-century Ukrainian businesspeople
21st-century Ukrainian businesspeople
Businesspeople from Donetsk Oblast